The Immediate Geographic Region of Patos de Minas is one of the 3 immediate geographic regions in the Intermediate Geographic Region of Patos de Minas, one of the 70 immediate geographic regions in the Brazilian state of Minas Gerais and one of the 509 of Brazil, created by the National Institute of Geography and Statistics (IBGE) in 2017.

Municipalities 
It comprises 18 municipalities.

 Arapuá     
 Brasilândia de Minas     
 Carmo do Paranaíba     
 Guarda-Mor  
 João Pinheiro  
 Lagamar  
 Lagoa Formosa     
 Lagoa Grande   
 Matutina     
 Paracatu     
 Patos de Minas     
 Presidente Olegário   
 Rio Paranaíba    
 São Gonçalo do Abaeté   
 São Gotardo    
 Tiros    
 Varjão de Minas     
 Vazante

References 

Geography of Minas Gerais